Below is a list of squads used in the 2000 African Cup of Nations.

Group A

Coach:   Pierre Lechantre

Coach:   Giuseppe Dossena

Coach: Gbonka Tia Martin

Coach:   Gottlieb Goeller

Group B

Coach: Trott Moloto

Coach: Nasser Sandjak

Coach: Basilua Lusadusu

Coach:   Antonio Dumas

Group C

Coach:   Gerard Gili

Coach:   Peter Schnittger

Coach: Ben Bamfuchile

Coach:   René Taelman

Group D

Coach:   Jo Bonfrere

Coach:   Francesco Scoglio

Coach:   Henri Michel

Coach: David Memy

References

Africa Cup of Nations squads
African Cup Of Nations Squads, 2000